The Phoenix Hotel (originally the "New Phoenix") is a historic hotel in Waycross, Georgia, built about 1890.  It is a three-story brick building that occupies a  block of the city.  Businesses occupied the first floor, which has been modernized, but the other two floors retain their original configuration.  The building originally had two stories and the third floor was added in 1913.  It is near the train depot and catered to travelers.  It was added to the National Register of Historic Places in 1986.

Photos

References

External links
 
 Waycross Local History

Hotel buildings on the National Register of Historic Places in Georgia (U.S. state)
Mission Revival architecture in Georgia (U.S. state)
Hotel buildings completed in 1890
Buildings and structures in Ware County, Georgia
National Register of Historic Places in Ware County, Georgia